The Williams Institute on Sexual Orientation and Gender Identity Law and Public Policy, usually shortened to Williams Institute, is a public policy research institute based at the UCLA School of Law focused on sexual orientation and gender identities issues.

History 
The Williams Institute was founded in 2001 through a grant by Charles R. "Chuck" Williams. Williams's inaugural donation of $2.5 million to create the institute was the largest donation ever given to any academic institution in support of an LGBT academic program in any discipline. In 2013, Williams donated an additional $5.5 million to support the institute.

The Williams Project was founded to replace the pervasive bias against LGBT people in law, policy, and culture with independent research on LGBT issues. In 2006, the Williams Project merged with the Institute for Gay & Lesbian Strategic Studies, becoming the Williams Institute.

The institute's early years established a commitment to interdisciplinary research that continues today. Scholars analyzed the impact of marriage equality, filed amicus briefs in seminal cases like Lawrence v. Texas, and studied the demographic characteristics of same-sex couples. In 2011, the Williams Institute released one of the first data-backed estimates of the LGBT population in the U.S., which shed light on the potential impact of policies and laws on LGBT people nationwide.

For nearly two decades, policymakers, lawmakers, advocates, and the courts have relied on the Williams institute's expertise. Williams Institute scholars have consulted with government agencies to improve federal data collection of LGBT people. They have provided testimony to Congress in hearings on Don't Ask, Don't Tell and the Employment Non-Discrimination Act. Justice Anthony Kennedy cited Williams Institute estimates on the number of same-sex couples raising children as a deciding factor in the landmark decision in Obergefell v. Hodges, which granted marriage equality in the U.S.

Today, the Williams Institute has an annual budget of over $4.5 million and a staff of 25 with expertise in economics, public health, demographics, public policy, psychology, and law.

Activities 
The Williams Institute focuses on legal research, public policy analysis, judicial training, and leadership development. Their core focus issues include employment discrimination, same-sex marriage, adoption, LGBT youth, public health, immigration, poverty, and violence. The institute also provides an LGBT analysis of the United States Census.

Researchers 
Researchers involved with the Williams Institute include:

 M. V. Lee Badgett
 Nanette Gartrell
 Ilan H. Meyer
 Jody L. Herman
 Bianca D.M. Wilson
 Nancy D. Polikoff

References

External links 
 

2001 establishments in California
LGBT organizations in the United States
Organizations based in Los Angeles
Organizations established in 2001